Huaco may refer to:

 Guaco, a type of plant found in Central America, South America, and India
 , Argentina
 Huaco River, a river in Argentina
 Huaco (pottery), a type of pottery in Peru